Kurt Anthony James Walker (born 7 March 1995) is an Irish amateur boxer. He won gold medals at the 2018 EU Championships and 2019 European Games, silver at the 2018 Commonwealth Games and bronze at the 2017 European Championships.

Professional boxing record

References

External links
 
 
 
 
 

1995 births
Living people
Male boxers from Northern Ireland
Irish male boxers
Boxers at the 2018 Commonwealth Games
Commonwealth Games medallists in boxing
Commonwealth Games silver medallists for Northern Ireland
Sportspeople from Lisburn
Boxers at the 2015 European Games
European Games medalists in boxing
Boxers at the 2019 European Games
European Games gold medalists for Ireland
Bantamweight boxers
Boxers at the 2020 Summer Olympics
Olympic boxers of Ireland
Medallists at the 2018 Commonwealth Games